Caroe is a small hamlet in the parish of Otterham, Cornwall, England.

Immediately to the south of Caroe is Kernick and Ottery Meadows which is a designated Site of Special Scientific Interest (SSSI).

References

Hamlets in Cornwall